Wheal Vor was a metalliferous mine about  north west of Helston and  north of the village of Breage in the west of Cornwall, England, UK. It is considered to be part of the Mount's Bay mining district. Until the mid-19th century the mine was known for its willingness to try out new innovations. Although very rich in copper and tin ores, the mine never lived up to its expectations. During the later part of the 19th century it had several periods of closure, with an attempt to reopen it in the 1960s which was not successful mainly because of bureaucracy. Today the site is part of the Cornwall and West Devon Mining Landscape.

Geology
The country rock at the mine is killas, mostly hard, blue-grey rock. The mine's main produce was copper and tin derived from the nearby Tregonning-Godolphin granite, part of the Cornubian batholith. At the intersections the lodes widened and mineralization spread through the dykes, forming irregular masses which were stoped to the full width of the dykes.

Early history
Wheal Vor is an ancient mine: the ground shows the remains of old surface excavations following the lodes, and mining may have taken place here in late Roman times. The underground mine probably started in the 15th-century and continued until 1715 producing mainly copper ore. The mine was associated with the Godolphin family who were keen on trying out recent innovations, and through their connections it may have been the first mine in Cornwall to make use of gunpowder, at the close of the 17th century.

Shortly after 1700 the mine may have been one of the few sites to trial Thomas Savery's pump, which was, according to his patent application, "A new invention for raiseing of water … by the impellent force of fire, which will be of great use and advantage for drayning mines…". It is not certain whether Savery's experiments took place at Wheal Vor or at another nearby mine, but it is known that c. 1710 a Newcomen engine had been installed here, which was probably the first in Cornwall.

The mine was abandoned in about 1715 and it was almost a century before it was reopened by Captain John Gundry. It then continued to trial new inventions, such as the second Woolf engine in the county (1815); one of the first Brunton Calciners (1830); and an early man engine (c. 1856). It also one of the few mines to operate its own smelter, having taken over the one owned by the Cornish Copper Company (a major shareholder) in 1823 and later moving to the mine. Wheal Vor was also the site of the first steam stamping mill in 1812.

The years between 1812 and 1848 were the mine's most successful, and it was for a time the richest mine in Cornwall. The ore raised from the 274 fathom (501 metres) level contained on average 5% tin, instead of the 1–1.5% that was usually found in Cornish mines, and for some time after the discovery of this rich lode the mine regularly produced 200 tons of white tin per month. Despite this, the profits from the mine were not enough to keep Gundry's company solvent and in 1828 the company entered into bankruptcy, with the litigation lasting twenty years. In 1840 the mine was employing 1,174 people, but it closed between 1848 and 1853. Surface work continued at the site until 1852, when the mine property was under new ownership.

Before the mine was abandoned in 1848, its condition was described as being unsafe to work in, and accidents were attributed to these poor conditions. The mine was in litigation for some years before it was abandoned and during this time no repairs were made and safety conditions steadily became worse. However, under new ownership safety issues at the mine were corrected and it was reopened; afterwards employing about 1,200 men.

1850 onwards
In 1854 a  steam engine, the largest in Cornwall at the time, was installed on Crease's shaft for draining the mine. This engine was built by Harvey & Co of Hayle (the other main shareholder in the mine) and its starting was accompanied by a large celebration. But by 1860, it and another  were using 600 tons of coal a month, which was determined to be unsustainable so both engines were stopped and later sold.

From a peak production of over 840 tons of black tin in 1865 and 1866, the output from the mine declined until in 1877 only 13 tons was produced. Between 1877 and 1881 the mine was apparently idle until 1881 when five people were working there, and on 23 October 1879 the mine was put up for sale at a public auction. When running at its peak out of £2,000,000 worth of tin, Messrs Gundry and successors had a profit of £272,000. The Godolphin family and Messrs Williams and Co yielded nearly £100,000 in dividends from copper ore. An engine was erected near the head of the valley, in 1885, to extract tin from the accumulation of many years of waste which filled the valley. Until 1885 up to 22 people were employed, though only minimal amounts of ore were sold. There was another gap until 1906, when 65 people were recorded as working at the mine, 16 of them underground. The mine produced some black tin between 1907 and 1910, but then evidently closed again, probably due to difficulty keeping water out of the mine.

Wheal Vor was the main component of the "Great Wheal Vor United" group of mines, which included among others, Polladras Mine, Penhale Wheal Vor, Wheal Metal and Sithney Wheal Metal. Wheal Vor also took over the mining setts of two other mines; Carleen Mine (otherwise known as West Wheal Vor), and Wheal Vreah.

20th century to present
By the 1960s it was considered that the mine had never been fully developed and there were several ore bodies that could be commercially exploited. The sett was investigated by Camborne Tin Limited which submitted an application to re-open the mine. It was thought that as it might employ some 400 people in a designated Development Area which had an unemployment rate of 6% there was a good chance that permission would be granted, but planning permission was refused because the local water company obtained part of its water supply from an adit flowing out of the old mine. The water company was encouraged to locate an alternative source, and it identified Loe Pool as a potential source, but this was opposed on the grounds that it was polluted by sewage. The cost of treating this led to another public enquiry which caused delays.

Meanwhile, the ownership of the mineral rights for the proposed mine was also causing problems: although the major part was held by the Treworlis Estate which was cooperative, the 11th Duke of Leeds owned land that the deeper parts of the mine were to pass under, and negotiations with the Leeds Estates were prolonged and later complicated by the death of the Duke and then, within a year, the death of his successor without an heir in 1964. This meant the Leeds estate had to be sold which caused further delays.

Pending resolution of the outstanding issues, Camborne Tin Limited applied for permission to make exploratory drillings – this was granted, but they were not allowed to drill in the former Leeds Estate lands, and it became apparent that this was where the undiscovered ore bodies were likely to be found. In 1967, the company decided that it could no longer tolerate the delays, and the mine was never re-opened.

Today, there is little visible above ground of the once extensive sett of the mine. An engine house and chimney are the most obvious remains. The cottages at Wheal Vor have been listed as Grade II buildings since 22 December 1972. The Trevithick Society published a history of the mine, entitled Great Wheal Vor in October 2015. Since 2006 the site has been part of the Tregonning and Trewavas Mining District of the Cornwall and West Devon Mining Landscape.

Notes

References

Sources

Tin mines in Cornwall
Copper mines in Cornwall
Industrial archaeological sites in Cornwall